Hartigiola annulipes  is a species of midge fly in the family Cecidomyiidae, found in the Palearctic. The fly was first described by Theodor Hartig in 1839. The larvae gall the leaves of beech (Fagus species).

Description
In the spring, the gall starts as a tiny, flattened dome which can be seen on both surfaces of the leaf. At first the gall is yellowish-green and later changes to reddish-brown. The upper part gradually lengthens into a columnar shape, and in August and September is up to 6 mm high. The gall contain a single white larva, can be smooth or hairy and some develop a point. The gall falls to the floor when the larva is mature, leaving a circular hole in the leaf. Pupation takes place in the fallen gall and the adult midge emerges in the spring to lay eggs on the new leaves. The fly can be found in May and June.

Galls have been recorded on Oriental beech (Fagus orientalis) and European beech (Fagus sylvatica).

Distribution
Hartigiola annulipes is common and found in Europe from Ireland, France and Spain in the west, to the Ukraine and Russia in the east.

Parasite
Apiognomonia errabunda may cause the death of larvae when there is a large infestation.

References

 Bei-Bienko, G.Y. & Steyskal, G.C. (1988) Keys to the Insects of the European Part of the USSR, Volume V: Diptera and Siphonaptera, Parts I, II. Amerind Publishing Co., New Delhi.

External links
 Images representing Cecidomyiidae at BOLD

Cecidomyiidae
Insects described in 1839
Nematoceran flies of Europe
Galls
Taxa named by Theodor Hartig